The American Cinema Editors Award for Best Edited Animated Feature Film is one of the annual awards given by the American Cinema Editors. This award was first given out in 2010.

Winners and nominees

2000s

2010s

2020s

References

External links
 

American Cinema Editors Awards
Awards established in 2010
American animation awards